Iceberg B-17B was an iceberg twice the size of Manhattan, that floated in the southern ocean approximately  off the coast of Western Australia. B-17B originated in the first half of 2000 when the iceberg B17 split into two parts. B17 itself had broken off from the Ross Ice Shelf two months before.

In mid-December 2009 the Australian Bureau of Meteorology issued a warning to users of shipping lanes in the area. By the 31st of that month the main body of the iceberg had broken into three pieces.

See also 
 List of recorded icebergs by area

References

B-17B
Geography of Antarctica
Geography of Australia